Lucky Diokpara (born 11 January 1987 in Nigeria) is a Nigerian former professional footballer who is last known to have played for Persisko Tanjabar of the Liga Indonesia Premier Division in 2013. He also played for Sporting Afrique FC under  Foreign Clubs of Singapore Premier League or S League in 2006.

Indonesia

Strengthening Persisko Tanjabar of the Liga Indonesia Premier Division in 2013, Diokpara had to miss his team host Persih Tembilahan since his wife was pregnant. However, the Nigerian defender soon became enmeshed in a situation where Persisko did not pay him for months and he was detained at the immigration office in May that year for being suspected as an illegal immigrant.

References 

Living people
Nigerian footballers
Expatriate footballers in Indonesia
Association football defenders
Nigerian expatriate footballers
Singapore Premier League players
1987 births
Expatriate footballers in Singapore